The Madras Crocodile Bank Trust and Centre for Herpetology (MCBT) is a reptile zoo and herpetology research station, located  south of the city of Chennai, in state of Tamil Nadu, India. The centre is both a registered trust and a recognized zoo under the Wildlife (Protection) Act, 1972 and comes under the purview of the Central Zoo Authority, Ministry of Environment and Forests, Government of India. It was established with the aim of saving three Indian endangered species of crocodile—the marsh or mugger crocodile, the saltwater crocodile, and the gharial, which at the time of founding of the trust were all nearing extinction.

The CrocBank grounds are covered by coastal dune forest providing a haven for native wildlife, including large breeding colonies of water birds and a secure nesting beach for olive ridley sea turtles. The high aquifer on the sandy coast provides sufficient water supply and the proximity to the major tourist destination of Mahabalipuram ensures annual visitation. The centre is the biggest crocodile sanctuary in India. The centre has one of the world's largest collections of crocodiles and alligators and has bred 5,000 crocodiles and alligators representing 14 of the 23 existing species, including the three crocodile species, all considered endangered, that are native to India. As of 2011, the CrocBank has a total of 2,483 animals, including 14 species of crocodiles, 10 species of turtles, 3 species of snakes, and 1 species of lizard.

History

Large-scale commercial hunting of Indian crocodilians for their skin began towards the end of the 19th century, and by the 1970s, crocodile populations were severely depleted. The Madras Crocodile Bank was conceived in 1973 and started on 26 August 1976 by herpetologist Romulus Whitaker and his wife Zai Whitaker at the time when the Indian government protected all three species of Indian crocodilians under the Wild Life Protection Act of 1972. The real push for captive breeding of crocodiles came after the launch of the Indian Crocodile Conservation Project by the Indian government in collaboration with the United Nations Development Programme (UNDP) and the Food and Agriculture Organization (FAO) in 1975. The bank was started to protect India's dwindling crocodile population and to preserve the art of snake catching. Along with other like-minded people such as Rajamani, Whitaker founded the bank to conserve the three species of reptiles namely, the mugger (Crocodylus palustris), the gharial (Gavialis gangeticus), and the saltwater crocodile (Crocodylus porosus).

The CrocBank developed a captive breeding program for freshwater turtles and tortoises in 1981 and it successfully bred gharials for the first time in 1989.

In 1984, the bank collaborated with Dr. J.W. Lang from University of North Dakota, who initiated a major project on the reproductive biology of the mugger crocodile. The research infrastructure at the bank was augmented by the funds for this project, chiefly a well-equipped laboratory and the collaboration with the Centre for Cellular and Molecular Biology.  This project was continued every year between 1984 and 1994 by Harry Andrews under the supervision of Dr. Lang, who made periodic visits to the bank. The project currently focuses on reptile reproduction, egg incubation, and temperature-dependent sex determination. A 3-year study of the biology and conservation of the mugger crocodile was conducted in the wild and a field station was established on the Moyar River near Bhavanisagar in Tamil Nadu.

Since 1987, studies on breeding biology and growth of lizards, particularly the larger monitor lizards, were conducted in collaboration with researchers in the United Kingdom and Germany. During the period 1989–1991, amphibians studies were carried out on the species Rana hexadactyla, which was featured in BBC Wildlife Magazine in 1996. In 1990, the MCBT newsletter was transformed into a scientific journal, with an international editorial board and a rigorous peer-review system for the acceptance of technical papers for publication. In 1992, a scientific committee consisting of scientists and trustees was instituted and is charged with directing and coordinating research. In 1993, the bank conducted surveys on wetlands and remote area sensing. This was followed by extensive studies on sea snakes, marine turtles, bats, and other small mammals and studies on herpetofauna, biogeography, resource use, land use, rain-water harvesting and coral reef socioeconomics, in addition to protected area management planning, ecologically suitable management planning.

The bank was started with only 30 mugger adults, which grew to 8,000 by the 1990s. Although the breeding program was a great success and many crocodiles were initially released back into the wild, this practice has essentially stopped now due to the loss of habitat. By 2010, there were 14 species of crocodilians at the bank.

In 2003, with the addition of turtles, lizards and snakes, the bank was renamed the Madras Crocodile Bank Trust and Center for Herpetology. The centre is one of the largest reptile zoos in the world.

In 2020 Madras Crocodile Bank Trust faced financial crisis due to the unprecedented COVID-19 Pandemic lockdown.

Organisation

Campuses

Main campus location and visitors 

In 2010–2011, the CrocBank received 367,574 visitors, including 13,794 foreign visitors, with maximum number visiting in the month of January, when 53,763 people visited the zoological park. This includes 15,780 students and 1,854 teachers from 258 schools visiting the park.

Field campuses 

The CrocBank runs two permanent and fully staffed field bases, viz., the Andaman and Nicobar Environmental Team and the Agumbe Rainforest Research Station, and usually also has several field projects running.

Objectives

The Madras Crocodile Bank Trust's stated objectives are as follows:
 The conservation of nature and natural resources in the broadest sense, with particular focus on the conservation of herpetofauna and their habitats.
 To establish breeding, research, educational, dissemination and transfer centers, field stations, and other establishments focusing on ecological and environmental issues.

Affiliations and partnerships 

A partial listing of the institutions that the CrocBank is affiliated with, including committees, membership, collaboration, consultation, editorial, and networking, as of 2011:

 The World Conservation Union (IUCN)
 IUCN/SSC Crocodile Specialist Group
 IUCN/SSC Tortoise and Freshwater Turtles Specialist Group
 IUCN/SSC Marine Turtle Specialist Group
 IUCN/SSC Indian Subcontinent Reptile & Amphibian Group
 IUCN/SSC Captive Breeding Specialist Group
 IUCN/SSC Sustainable Use of Wild Species Group
 Centre for Cellular and Molecular Biology, Hyderabad
 World Congress of Herpetology
 World Wide Fund for Nature (WWF)—India & International
 Wildlife Institute of India, Dehradun
 Bombay Natural History Society, Mumbai
 Centre for Environment Education, Ahmedabad
 Chicago Herpetological Society, United States
 Fauna and Flora International, UK
 Development Alternatives, New Delhi
 Irula Tribal Women’s Welfare Society, Chennai
 Irula Snake Catchers’ Cooperative Society, Chennai
 International Association of Zoo Educators, UK
 Jersey Wildlife Preservation Trust, UK
 Niligiri Wildlife Association, Ootacamand
 Central Zoo Authority of India, New Delhi
 Sálim Ali Centre for Ornithology and Natural History, Coimbatore
 Madras Veterinary College, Chennai
 Madurai Kamaraj University, Madurai
 Pondicherry University, Pondicherry
 Andaman & Nicobar Islands State Wildlife Board, Port Blair
 Andaman & Nicobar Islands State Level Environmental Council, Port Blair.
 Andaman & Nicobar Islands 'Monitoring Committee for the Working Plan for the South Andaman Division'.
 Andaman & Nicobar Coastal Zone Management Authority.
 Andamans Science Association, Port Blair
 Society for the Andaman & Nicobar Ecology, Port Blair
 Auroville Index Seminum, Tamil Nadu
 Ashoka Innovators for the Public, New Delhi
 Kalpavriksh, Pune
 Coral Reef Monitoring Network—South East Asia, Sri Lanka
 Survival International, UK
 Trust for Environmental Education (TREE), Chennai
 Zoo Outreach Organisation, Coimbatore
 The Indian people’s Tribunal on Environment &Human Rights, Mumbai
 The Wildlife Trust of India, New Delhi
 Smithsonian Institution, United States
 Marine Conservation Society, UK
 UNEP/Conservation for Migratory Species of Wild Animals, Germany

Wildlife conservation activities

Animal research and publication 

The bank acts as a large outdoor laboratory and provides opportunity to observe and document the reptiles' features, behavior, social interactions, and breeding biology at close range. Select enclosures are wired to record all the basic environmental parameters to facilitate studies on the biology of the reptiles at the bank. The bank has served as a regional source of status information for the World Conservation Monitoring Centre and has hosted numerous international meetings of the IUCN Specialist Groups dealing with reptiles. Since 1978, the centre has also hosted numerous local and international specialists.

Research 

A total of 300 individuals of 20 species are kept as part of the centre's ongoing research program. In addition, the bank also conducts research on the biology of crocodiles, turtles and monitors lizards.

Research in freshwater turtles and tortoises in India: Center is home to 28 species of freshwater turtles and tortoises some of which are extremely endangered. Research at center started in the early 1980s when Prof. Edward Moll of Eastern Illinois University accepted an Indo-American Fellowship for a year-long sabbatical and based his studies and surveys, conducted throughout India, at the CrocBank. The bank's research biologists have studied freshwater turtles in the Chambal River in Uttar Pradesh on a WWF-India grant.

Publications 

The bank publishes a biannual herpetology journal called Hamadryad and is home to the largest library of herpetological literature in India. Research in the field of herpetology within the bank has resulted in over 600 scientific publications, books, reports, newspaper and magazine articles and films.

Outreach and consulting 

The CrocBank serves as a consultant on reptile management and conservation issues by a wide range of organisations including Food and Agriculture Organization, World Wide Fund for Nature, IUCN, National Geographic Society and the governments of India, Papua New Guinea, Bangladesh, Mozambique, Malaysia, Indonesia, Bhutan, Brunei, Sri Lanka and Nepal.

The bank conducts environmental education programme for schools and villages including nature camps, field trips, education programmes for the nature clubs, training workshops for teachers, youth from fishing villages and other resource personnel. Frequent mobile exhibition-cum-awareness programmes for the nearby fishing villages along the East Coast Road are also conducted. The bank also has a multi-puppet theatre facility for children.

The bank also has an animal-adoption programme under which patrons can sponsor an animial housed at the center.

Veterinary care

The CrocBank has a veterinary care section with an onsite vet. The veterinary staff coordinates with the curatorial staff ensuring health and maintenance of the animals. Pathological and parasitological examinations are carried out on all the animals on a routine basis and a regular screening and treatment protocol is followed. Individual animals are given a unique identification number by means of pit tags which helps keep track of the animal's medical history. Capacity building in the form of reptile-centric veterinary training is carried out at the CrocBank on a regular basis to help equip zoos and conservation projects throughout India with the necessary skills for proper reptile management.

Wildlife captive breeding

Crocodile conservation 

One of the main attractions of the bank is the Crocodile Conservation Center. It is the largest breeding center of crocodiles in India and has bred thousands of crocodiles since its inception. The captive breeding program at the crocodile bank was so successful that by the 1990s there were over 8,000 crocodiles in residence, thousands had been reintroduced to the wild, and more sent to zoos and wildlife parks around the world. The CrocBank has supplied crocodile eggs, snakes, water monitors, lizards and iguanas for breeding programs and for exhibits. The bank also provides surplus reptiles for transferring to other zoos and exchange programs. Since 1976, over 1,500 crocodiles and several hundred eggs have been supplied to various state forest departments for restocking programmes in the wild and for setting up breeding facilities in other states in India and neighboring countries. All three of the original species that were bred at the bank (the mugger, the gharial and the saltwater crocodile) remain endangered, while the gharial is critically endangered and now faces extinction. The CrocBank also successfully breeds several species of threatened turtles, including two listed as critically endangered. The bank is a coordinating zoo of the Central Zoo Authority of India for the breeding programmes for endangered species, including rock python, king cobra and Ganges softshell turtle, as per the National Zoo Policy adopted by the Government of India in 1988. The National Zoo Policy (1998) states several objectives that zoos should pursue including education, publications, and breeding rare and endangered species. In 2010, the bank also bred the rare Tomistoma crocodile, which is in the Red List of the International Union for Conservation of Nature (IUCN).

Turtles and tortoises conservation 

In 2003, a 10-year program for the conservation of freshwater turtles and tortoises was initiated by the bank in collaboration with government forest departments from concerned states across India. In May 2004, the bank successfully bred one of the world's most critically endangered turtles, the Indian painted roof turtle, Batagur kachuga, for the first time ever in captivity. The species is protected under Schedule I of the Indian Wildlife Protection Act of 1972 and is listed under the Action Plan Rating I of the IUCN/SSC Tortoise and Freshwater Turtle Specialist Group. The bank is home to another near endemic Batagur turtle, Batagur baska. Incidentally, recent evidence suggests that this species is extinct in the wild and only 13 individuals remain in captivity, including 4 adult females of which 2 are at the CrocBank. The bank sends 50% of its stock of the red-crowned roof turtle to the Uttar Pradesh forest department to introduce into the wild. In 2004, concerned parties created the Gharial Multi-Task Force (renamed to Gharial Conservation Alliance in 2008) to create a specialist organization dedicated to saving gharials from extinction.

The 2012-2013 Annual Report of MCBT states that it is planning to acquire one Northern river terrapin from Vienna Zoo.

Snake conservation and venom extraction

The park is home to one of the only approved snake venom extraction centres in India, the Irula Snake Catchers' Industrial Cooperative Society, which has a daily venom extraction show for the public at its snake farm. The cooperative society was officially registered on 19 December 1978, and venom extraction was started on 16 December 1982. Started with 26 members, the membership of the society rose to 350 by 2001, and the society now has about 344 members and is the largest venom-producing center in India with annual sales of over US$15,000.

The bank is planning to procure green anacondas under an international exchange programme. The anacondas have since been procured and are housed in enclosures. As part of the efforts to give due importance to its exhibition potential, along with education and research, the bank was also engaged in talks with some conservation and breeding centres to procure Komodo dragons. Four Komodo dragons - three males, one female - have since been acquired from Bronx Zoo in New York. The bank also plans to get as many as 21 spotted pond turtles from Hong Kong.

Exhibits

Summary count of exhibited species 

The bank is home to 14 species of the 23 crocodilian species living across the world, two of which are listed by the IUCN as critically endangered and three more as threatened. The 14 crocodile species available in the bank are mugger (Crocodylus palustris), salt-water crocodile (Crocodylus porosus), gharial (Gavialis gangeticus), tomistoma (Tomistoma schlegelii), American alligator (Alligator mississippiensis), Morelet's crocodile (Crocodylus Moreletii), spectacled caiman (Caiman crocodilus), West African dwarf crocodile (Osteolaemus tetraspis), Australian fresh water crocodile (Crocodylus Johnsoni), African slender-snouted crocodile (Mecistops cataphractus), dwarf caiman (Paleosuchus palpebrosus), yacare caiman (Caiman yacare), Nile crocodile (Crocodylus niloticus) and the endangered Siamese crocodile (Crocodylus siamensis). The bank currently houses over 2,400 crocodiles and also many species of turtles, snakes, and lizards which are viewable by the public. The bank houses 12 endangered species of turtles and tortoises and 5 species of snakes, including king cobra (Ophiophagus hannah), Asian water monitors (Varanus salvator salvator), two species of pythons, and albino cobras. Of the 5,000 reptiles bred at the bank, 3,000 represent the native Indian species Crocodylus palustris, known as muggers. One of the biggest attractions of the park is a fierce salt-water crocodile known as Jaws III. The bank is also going to get four new species of crocodiles. These are black caimans, smooth-fronted caimans, Cuban crocodiles and broad-snouted caimans. Anacondas will also appear at the bank. Since April, 2016 four Komodo dragons - three male, one female - have been added to the list of exhibits. The dragons were acquired from Bronx Zoo in New York.

The bank also functions as a natural shelter for a variety of birds, enabling bird-watching.

Breakdown of exhibited species 

Reptile stock at the CrocBank as on 1 April 2011 is as follows:

Night safari 

The bank plans to introduce a night safari between 7 p.m. and 8.30 p.m. on Saturdays and Sundays. The visitors can observe the crocodiles during the night time, splashing water, jaw-slapping or reclaiming territories. They will be taught counting crocs in the night by counting the bright eye shines. The centre also plans to have on display the Aldabras tortoises from the islands of Seychelles.

Awards and grants

In 2001, the CrocBank was awarded the Ford Conservation and Environmental Grant for project "Integrated Environment Education", a multi-lingual programme on reptile preservation to create an environmental awareness.

In 2005, Rom Whitaker was given a Whitley Award and used the money to set up the Agumbe Rainforest Research Station (ARRS) to help preserve the hyper-diverse animals and ecosystems that make up the rainforest of the Western Ghats. In 2006, Rom was presented with the Sanctuary-ABN AMRO Lifetime Service Award. The renowned herpetologist has been bestowed with the prestigious padma shri award by the Government of India in 2018.

Future development

The CrocBank, along with the Arignar Anna Zoological Park, Chennai Snake Park and the Mysore Zoo, is slated to become a nodal point for captive breeding of endangered pythons in the country, especially the Indian rock python (Python molurus) and reticulated python (Python reticulatus).

In January 2010, the CrocBank has started constructing a new frontage and satellite facility. This will be followed by the complete redesign and construction of the main display area including new enclosures, walkways and interactive features. The bank is also planning to open a second bank in Goa, on India's western coast.

In February 2013, a new master plan for a major renovation, which was developed upon the request by the Central Zoo Authority, was approved by the government. Per the new plan, estimated at  100 million and to take four years to complete, the park will be divided into geographical areas, namely, Asia, Americas, Amazon and Africa, with thematic landscaping and signage, a sweeping gharial river exhibit, a walkway over the crocodile marsh, and an underwater viewing area, in addition to a grand entry plaza with a café and a new parking area. A new interpretation centre, to be built in two levels, will have small crocs, snakes, turtles and lizards on the upper level and underwater viewing of Jaws III, the largest saltwater crocodile exhibit in the park, on the lower level. It will also have interactive displays of various aspects of croc biology, conservation and general reptile information. The Amazon section will feature all crocs from the region as well as snakes such as anacondas and boa constrictors and fish like piranhas.

See also
 Arignar Anna Zoological Park
 Chennai Snake Park Trust
 Guindy National Park

Notes

References
The Madras Crocodile Bank is mentioned in this PBS documentary

External links

Official website of: "Central Zoo Authority of India" (CZA), Government of India
Official website of: Andaman and Nicobar Environmental Team Centre for Island Ecology

Tourist attractions in Chennai
Zoos in Tamil Nadu
Zoology organizations
Herpetology organizations
Organizations established in 1976
1976 establishments in Tamil Nadu
Crocodilians of Asia